Marcus Derrickson (born February 1, 1996) is an American professional basketball player who last played for Seoul Samsung Thunders of the Korean Basketball League. He played college basketball for Georgetown.

High school career
Derrickson played three years of high school basketball for Paul VI Catholic High School in Virginia, leading the Panthers to two Washington Catholic Athletic Conference titles. As a junior, he averaged 11.8 points per game and was named to the All-Met Team. Derrickson transferred to Brewster Academy in New Hampshire for his final high school year. He was the No. 81 overall prospect in his class according to Rivals.com and committed to Georgetown in October 2013.

College career
As a freshman at Georgetown, Derrickson posted 7.1 points and 4.5 rebounds per game. Derrickson averaged 8.3 points and 4.4 rebounds per game was a sophomore. As a junior, he was named to the Second Team All-Big East. On January 20, 2018, Derrickson scored a career-high 27 points in a win over St. John's in double overtime. In the final game of the season, a loss to Villanova, Derrickson sat out due to an injured right ankle. Derrickson averaged 15.9 points and 8.1 rebounds per game, second on the team in both categories to Jessie Govan, and was the top three-point shooter, making 46.5 percent of his attempts. After his junior season, Derrickson signed with an agent and entered the NBA draft, thus forgoing his senior season at Georgetown.

Professional career

Golden State Warriors (2018–2019)
After going undrafted in the 2018 NBA Draft, Derrickson signed with the Golden State Warriors for NBA Summer League play. Derrickson signed a training camp contract with the Warriors on September 20, 2018. On October 13, the Warriors converted the deal to a two-way contract with their NBA G League affiliate, the Santa Cruz Warriors. In his G League debut, Derrickson contributed 20 points on 7-of-10 shooting, three rebounds and three assists as the Warriors defeated the Northern Arizona Suns 118–108. Derrickson made his NBA debut on November 10, 2018, recording 2 points and 1 rebound, in 6 minutes, in a 116–100 win against the Brooklyn Nets. The Warriors made it to the 2019 NBA Finals, but were defeated in 6 games by the Toronto Raptors.

College Park Skyhawks (2019–2020)
On August 23, 2019, Derrickson signed an Exhibit 10 contract with the Atlanta Hawks. On October 18, 2019, the Hawks waived Derrickson. He was then added to the roster of the Hawks’ G League affiliate, the College Park Skyhawks. Despite averaging 13.1 points, 5.3 rebounds and 1.8 assists over 27.8 minutes per contest, Derrickson was waived on March 4, 2020.

KT Sonicboom (2020–2021)
On June 26, 2020, it was reported that Busan KT Sonicboom had added Derrickson to their roster.

Goyang Orion Orions (2021–2022)
On December 11, 2021, Derrickson signed with the Goyang Orion Orions.

Maine Celtics (2022)
On March 8, 2022, Derrickson was acquired by the Maine Celtics from the available player pool.

Seoul Samsung Thunders (2022–present)
On August 11, 2022, he has signed with Seoul Samsung Thunders of the Korean Basketball League.

Career statistics

NBA

Regular season

|-
| style="text-align:left;"| 
| style="text-align:left;"|Golden State
| 11 || 0 || 6.1 || .485 || .500 || .800 || 1.2 || .1 || .0 || .1 || 4.2
|- class="sortbottom"
| style="text-align:center;" colspan="2"| Career
| 11 || 0 || 6.1 || .485 || .500 || .800 || 1.2 || .1 || .0 || .1 || 4.2

References

External links
 
 Georgetown Hoyas bio

1996 births
Living people
21st-century African-American sportspeople
African-American basketball players
American men's basketball players
Basketball players from Washington, D.C.
Brewster Academy alumni
College Park Skyhawks players
Georgetown Hoyas men's basketball players
Golden State Warriors players
Maine Celtics players
People from Bowie, Maryland
Santa Cruz Warriors players
Small forwards
Sportspeople from the Washington metropolitan area
Undrafted National Basketball Association players